Crossfaderz is the second album by turntablist Roc Raida.  It was released on July 11, 2000 for Moonshine Music and featured production from Roc Raida, DJ Q-Bert, D-Styles and The X-Ecutioners.

Track listing
"Who You Fuckin' Wit?"- 2:07
"Keep It Real Airlines"- 1:29
"What Car and Limo Service"- :57
"The Enemy"- 4:19 (Featuring Diggin' in the Crates Crew)
"Visualize"- 2:14 (Featuring Mister Complex)
"Conceited Bastard"- 3:03 (Featuring Mad Skillz)
"Tried By 12"- 2:52
"The Session"- 2:51
"Fist of the White Lotus"- 1:03
"Caller Trying to Win Tickets"- 1:00
"Missing in Action"- 3:33
"Raida's Theme"- 3:38 (Featuring WaynO of the E. Bros)
"The Heist"- 3:16 (Featuring Big L)
"Drop It Heavy"- 4:28 (Featuring Showbiz & AG)
"Lifestyles of the Rich and Dangerous"- 2:33
"One Man Band"- 3:10
"Black Pack Rapper"- 2:02
"Slash Ya Face Records"- 1:25
"Bitch in Yoo"- 3:52 (Featuring Common)
"Find That"- 3:37 (Featuring The Beatnuts)
"Getting Closer to God"- 3:34 (Featuring Krumbsnatcha, DJ Premier
"MC-2"- 2:59 (Featuring Diamond D)
"Razorblade Alcohol Slide"- 3:34 (Featuring DJ Q-Bert, D-Styles)

Personnel 

The Beatnuts – Producer
Beats Anonymous – Performer
Big L – Performer
DJ Spinna – Producer
DMC – Photo Courtesy
East Flatbush Project – Performer
Missin' Linx – Performer
Roc Raida – Producer, DJ, Mixing
Pete Rock – Producer
Show & A.G. – Performer
Skillz – Performer
The X-ecutioners – Performer

References

2000 albums
Roc Raida albums